The Harrisburg–Carlisle metropolitan statistical area, officially the Harrisburg–Carlisle, PA Metropolitan Statistical Area, and also referred to as the Susquehanna Valley, is defined by the Office of Management and Budget as an area consisting of three counties in South Central Pennsylvania, anchored by the cities of Harrisburg and Carlisle. 

As of the 2020 census, the metropolitan statistical area (MSA) had a population of 591,712, making it the fourth-most-populous metropolitan area in Pennsylvania, after the Delaware Valley, Greater Pittsburgh, and the Lehigh Valley.

Since 2012, it has been defined as part of the Harrisburg–York–Lebanon combined statistical area, which also includes York, Lebanon, and Adams counties.

Components 
The Harrisburg–Carlisle Metropolitan Area consists of three counties, located entirely within the Commonwealth of Pennsylvania. The following three counties are designated as being part of the greater Harrisburg–Carlisle area:

 Cumberland County, Pennsylvania
 Dauphin County, Pennsylvania
 Perry County, Pennsylvania
Officially, Lebanon County is not part of the Harrisburg–Carlisle metropolitan statistical area, and hasn't been since 2003, and is rather part of combined statistical area; however, it is culturally considered to be part of Greater Harrisburg with Harrisburg suburbs extending into the county.

Combined Statistical Area 

Additionally, three more counties are included as part of the Harrisburg–York–Lebanon, PA Combined Statistical Area. Collectively, they have a population of 1,271,801 people, making it the 46th-most-populous combined statistical area (CSA) in the United States, and the 3rd-most-populous CSA in the state of Pennsylvania.

 Adams County, Pennsylvania
 Lebanon County, Pennsylvania
 York County, Pennsylvania

Statistical history 
1950: The Harrisburg standard metropolitan area (SMA), consisting of Cumberland and Dauphin counties, was first defined.
1959: Following a term change by the Bureau of the Budget (present-day Office of Management and Budget), the Harrisburg SMA became the Harrisburg standard metropolitan statistical area (SMSA).
1963: Perry County added to the Harrisburg SMSA.
1983: Harrisburg SMSA renamed the Harrisburg–Lebanon–Carlisle metropolitan statistical area (MSA); Lebanon County added to the MSA.
2003: MSA split into two separate metropolitan areas – Harrisburg–Carlisle metropolitan statistical area (Cumberland, Dauphin, and Perry counties) and the Lebanon metropolitan statistical area (Lebanon County); Both MSAs together form the Harrisburg–Carlisle–Lebanon combined statistical area.
2010: The Harrisburg–York–Lebanon urban agglomeration area is defined for the first time, linking York County to the CSA.
2012: The Harrisburg–York–Lebanon combined statistical area was formally defined and includes the counties of York and Adams.

Geography and climate

Geography 
Harrisburg–Carlisle is located in the Susquehanna River's valley, which makes the terrain rolling, with occasional flat land and tall hills. The metropolitan area is underlain with limestone, which makes the land ideal for farming. Much of the region is within the piedmont region of the United States.

Climate 
The Harrisburg metropolitan area has a humid continental climate, experiencing four mild seasons: summer, autumn, winter, and spring. The average high temperature is 62 °F, while the average low is 44 °F. Harrisburg receives about 41 inches of rainfall annually.

Communities 

Places with more than 40,000 inhabitants
 Harrisburg (Principal City)
Places with 10,000 to 20,000 inhabitants
 Carlisle
 Hershey
 Colonial Park
Places with 1,000 to 10,000 inhabitants
 Progress
 Mechanicsburg
 Middletown
 Camp Hill
 New Cumberland
 Lower Allen
 Linglestown
 Enola
 Steelton
 Shippensburg
 Paxtonia
 Schlusser
 Lemoyne
 Hummelstown
 Rutherford

 Skyline View
 Lawnton
 Boiling Springs
 Wormleysburg
 Penbrook
 Shippensburg University
 Millersburg
 Marysville
 Highspire
 Messiah College
 Mount Holly Springs
 Lykens
 Newport
 Shiremanstown
 Paxtang
 Duncannon
 Elizabethville
 Bressler
 Williamstown
 Newville
 Palmdale
 West Fairview

 New Bloomfield
 Enhaut
Places with fewer than 1,000 inhabitants
 Liverpool
 Wiconsico
 Royalton
 Halifax
 Dauphin
 Gratz
 Millerstown
 Oberlin
 Lenkerville
 New Kingstown
 Union Deposit
 Plainfield
 Berrysburg
 Newburg
 Pillow
 Blain
 Landisburg
 New Buffalo

Demographics

As of the census of 2000, there were 509,074 people, 202,380 households, and 134,557 families residing within the MSA. The racial makeup of the MSA was 86.20% White, 9.39% African American, 0.15% Native American, 1.68% Asian, 0.03% Pacific Islander, 1.17% from other races, and 1.37% from two or more races. Hispanic or Latino of any race were 2.67% of the population.

The median income for a household in the MSA was $43,374, and the median income for a family was $51,792. Males had a median income of $36,368 versus $26,793 for females. The per capita income for the MSA was $21,432.

In 2009 the urban population of the MSA increased to 383,008 from 362,782 in 2000, a change of 20,226 people.

Transportation

Roads and highways 
The Harrisburg–Carlisle metropolitan area is served by a number of interstates, US routes, and state highways that help facilitate the movement of people and goods throughout the region. Major routes in the region include:

 
 
 
 
 
 
 
 
 
 
 
 
 
 

 
 
 
 
 
 
 
 
 
 
 
 
 
 

 
 
 
 
 
 
 
 
 
 
 
 
  SR 3032

Air 
Harrisburg International Airport (MDT) is the primary airport for the Harrisburg–Carlisle area. Located in Middletown, the airport serviced 1.137 million passengers in 2017. It is Pennsylvania's 3rd-busiest airport. It is owned and operated by the Susquehanna Area Regional Airport Authority, which also operates several other airports throughout South Central Pennsylvania.

Some residents utilize Baltimore/Washington, Ronald Reagan Washington, and Philadelphia airports for a wider selection of destinations and airlines.

Rail 
Harrisburg–Carlisle is served by Amtrak's Keystone Service and Pennsylvanian. Amtrak's Keystone Service, which terminates at Harrisburg Transportation Center, allows for rail trips to points east, including Philadelphia and New York City. The Pennsylvanian connects Harrisburg–Carlisle with Pittsburgh and New York City (by way of Philadelphia).

Currently, the Harrisburg–Carlisle region is not served by any commuter rail; however, there were plans to bring it to the metropolitan and combined statistical areas. Plans included a commuter rail line, called the Capital Red Rose Corridor, running from Lancaster to Harrisburg, with a possible extension to Carlisle.

Bus 
The region is interconnected by bus services, which offer service for local and regional trips, as well as for intercity trips. The primary bus service provider for the region is Capital Area Transit (CAT). CAT provides local and commuter bus service in eastern Cumberland and southern Dauphin counties. Its services are used by about 8,000 daily riders. Intercity bus service is primarily provided by Greyhound Lines and Fullington Trailways.

Colleges and universities 

The Harrisburg–Carlisle metropolitan area is home to several universities. The following is a list of non-profit colleges and universities within Harrisburg–Carlisle:

Cumberland County 

 Central Penn College
 Dickinson College
 Messiah University
 Penn State Dickinson School of Law
 Shippensburg University of Pennsylvania
 United States Army War College

Dauphin County 

 HACC, Central Pennsylvania's Community College (Harrisburg Campus)
 Harrisburg University of Science and Technology
 Penn State College of Medicine
 Penn State Harrisburg
 Widener University Commonwealth Law School

Media 
The Harrisburg–Carlisle metropolitan area is located entirely within the Harrisburg–York–Lebanon media market. It is the 42nd largest in the United States, with 772,810 households .

Newspapers 

 The Patriot-News
 Central Penn Business Journal
 Press and Journal (Pennsylvania)
 Carlisle Sentinel

Television 
The Harrisburg TV market is served by:

 WGAL – (NBC)
 WXBU – (Comet)
 WHBG-TV – cable-only, public access
 WHP-TV – (CBS)
 WHTM-TV – (ABC)
 WCZS-LD – (CTVN)
 WITF-TV – (PBS)
 WPMT – (Fox)
 WLYH – independent, religious
 PCN-TV, is a cable television network dedicated to 24-hour coverage of government and public affairs in the commonwealth.
 Roxbury News –independent news

Radio 
The Harrisburg area's radio market is ranked 78th in the nation.This is a list of FM stations in the Harrisburg–Carlisle metropolitan area:

This is a list of AM stations in the Harrisburg–Carlisle metropolitan area:

Area codes 
The entire Harrisburg–Carlisle metropolitan area is served by two area codes:

 717: area code used in South Central Pennsylvania
 223: overlay plan with 717 area code

See also

Pennsylvania statistical areas
List of Pennsylvania metropolitan areas
List of United States metropolitan areas
List of United States combined statistical areas

References

External links

PA MSA 1990 Census and 1994 Population Estimates
Quickfacts from U.S. Census Bureau
census.gov Population of Counties by Decennial Census: 1900 to 1990

 
Metropolitan areas of Pennsylvania
Harrisburg, Pennsylvania
Carlisle, Pennsylvania
Geography of Cumberland County, Pennsylvania
Geography of Dauphin County, Pennsylvania
Geography of Perry County, Pennsylvania
Susquehanna Valley